Armenian–Assyrian relations covers the historical relations between the Armenians and the Assyrians, dating back to the mid 1st millennium BC.

The southern border of Greater Historic Armenia, which covered an area of about 350,000 square km, shared a border with Assyria. Both the Armenians and Assyrians were among the first peoples to convert to Christianity.  Today, a few thousand Armenians live in the Assyrian homeland, and about three thousand Assyrians live in Armenia.

History of Armenia and Assyria
The Assyrian–Armenian interrelations and interactions history numbers many centuries, both in pre-Christian and post-Christian era. According to the legend, the Armenian patriarch Hayk defeated the evil Assyrian ruler Bel in an epic battle, in order to win his people's freedom. He named this territory Hayastan, and the Armenians are still using this name. This legend is a part of Armenia's rich and storied history, where Armenian heroes fought against evil invaders and conquerors for their freedom. There is also the story of the Armenian king Ara the Beautiful who refused Assyrian Queen Semiramis’s offer to a marriage and become king of the world. Semiramis outraged by Ara's refusal, wages a war against Armenia and demands Ara's capture alive.

Today, several thousands of Armenians live in villages in Syria, Iraq, Iran, Turkey that have Assyrian population as well, however their number have  been decreased significantly after the Iraqi war in 2003, the 1979 Iranian Revolution, and the Syrian Crisis/revolution that has started in 2011 as most of them migrated back to Armenia after Armenian government granted them Armenian citizenship, some Assyrians of Syria and Iraq have also migrated to Sweden and Australia legally to run away from Iraqi war and Syrian Crisis. There are also three thousand Assyrians that live in Armenia. More came after Armenia obtained their independence in 1991, and after most of the secular regimes in the Arab countries and Iran have started to collapse and are becoming replaced with Islamic, Shari'ah based governments, Assyrians have started to migrate to Armenia. Though low in numbers, Assyrians living in Armenia have complete and full rights with citizenship compared to in the Islamic nations. There are many mixed marriages between Armenians and Assyrians.

Genocide

The Armenians and Assyrians both suffered genocides within the Ottoman empire. The genocides were committed against mostly the Christian populations of the Ottoman Empire, which also included the Greek Pontic population.

See also
Assyrians in Armenia
Urartu–Assyria War

References

Assyrians in Armenia
Assyrian